Acanthopleura is a genus of chitons in the family Chitonidae.  In this genus the girdle is spiny or spiky. It has eight described species at present.

Species
According to the World Register of Marine Species (WoRMS), species in the genus Acanthopleura include 
 Acanthopleura brevispinosa (Sowerby, 1840)
 Acanthopleura echinata (Barnes, 1824)
 Acanthopleura gemmata (de Blainville, 1825)
 Acanthopleura granulata (Gmelin, 1791) 
 Acanthopleura loochooana (Broderip & Sowerby, 1829)
 Acanthopleura planispina Bergenhayn, 1933
 Acanthopleura spinosa (Bruguiere, 1792)
 Acanthopleura vaillantii de Rochebrune, 1882
 Acanthopleura hirtosa
 Acanthopleura gaimardi Blainville 1825

References

External links

Chitonidae
Chiton genera